Old car may refer to:
 Antique car, a collectible car of age that has been preserved or restored
 Classic car, a car of age that has been preserved or restored, but is short of the age in which it is considered antique
 Decrepit car, an old car in poor condition 
 Veteran car, pre-20th century car
 Vintage car, cars from model years 1919-1930